Motorail was the brand name for British Rail's long-distance services that carried passengers and their cars, ultimately part of the InterCity sector.

History
The service had originated in June 1955 with the introduction of the Car-Sleeper Limited between London and Perth. The service operated between June and September conveying car and driver for £15 return, inclusive of sleeping berth. In 1961 it was reported that over 50,000 cars had been transported and a new two-tier transporter was introduced to expand the capacity.

The Motorail brand was introduced in 1966 with the opening of the Kensington Olympia Motorail terminal.

Routes
Motorail operated from London to many places including Penzance, Plymouth, Fishguard Harbour, Brockenhurst, Carlisle, Edinburgh, Perth, Inverness and Fort William. A short-lived service from London to Glasgow was introduced in the early 1990s.

The service was popular at a time when long-distance travel by car involved long journey times, and additional services were introduced in 1972 between Stirling and Dover, London Kensington Olympia and Carmarthen and Birmingham and Inverness. An overnight service was also introduced between London Kensington and Carlisle to supplement the daytime service.

A variety of rolling stock, both open and enclosed, was used. Many routes were operated with overnight sleeper services. The open double deck Cartic 4 was first used on a Kensington Olympia to Perth Motorail on 22 June 1966. and last used in 1978.

Withdrawal
Usage on many routes had declined by the early 1990s. In 1989 the London to Stirling service was discontinued. The services operated at a significant loss and the service ceased in 1995 when British Rail was privatised.

First Great Western relaunched a service from London Paddington to Penzance as part of its Night Riviera overnight sleeper service in September 1999, with eight converted General Utility Vans but withdrew it at the end of summer 2005.

Gallery

References

See also
Accompanied car train
Auto-Train, a similar service in the United States

British Rail brands
British Rail passenger services
British Rail freight services
1955 establishments in the United Kingdom
1995 disestablishments in the United Kingdom